Bouchercon is an annual convention of creators and devotees of mystery and detective fiction. It is named in honour of writer, reviewer, and editor Anthony Boucher; also the inspiration for the Anthony Awards, which have been issued at the convention since 1986. This page details Bouchercon XLVI and the 2015 Anthony Awards ceremony.

Bouchercon 
The convention was held at Raleigh, North Carolina from 8–11 October 2015. The event was chaired by Al Abramson.

Special guests 
 Lifetime Achievement: Margaret Maron
 American Guests of Honor: Dr. Kathy Reichs & Tom Franklin
 International Guests of Honor: Zoë Sharp & Allan Guthrie
 Toastmasters: Lori Armstrong & Sean Doolittle
 Local Guest of Honor: Sarah Shaber
 Fan Guests of Honor: Lucinda Surber & Stan Ulrich
 The David Thompson Memorial Special Service Award: Bill and Toby Gottfried

Anthony Awards 
The following list details the awards distributed at the 2015 annual Anthony Awards ceremony.

Best Novel 
Winner:
 Laura Lippman, After I’m Gone
Shortlist:
 Joe Clifford, Lamentation
 Tana French, The Secret Place
 Louise Penny, The Long Way Home
 Hank Phillippi Ryan - Truth Be Told

Best First Novel 
Winner:
 Lori Rader-Day, The Black Hour
Shortlist:
 Kristi Belcamino, Blessed Are the Dead
 M.P. Cooley, Ice Shear
 Julia Dahl, Invisible City
 Allen Eskens, The Life We Bury

Best Paperback Original 
Winner:
 Catriona McPherson, The Day She Died
Shortlist:
 Alison Gaylin, Stay With Me
 Alex Marwood, The Killer Next Door
 Ben H. Winters, World of Trouble
 James W. Ziskin, No Stone Unturned

Best Critical Non-fiction Work 
Winner:
 Hank Phillippi Ryan, Writes of Passage: Adventures on the Writer’s Journey
Shortlist:
 Charles Brownson, The Figure of the Detective: A Literary History and Analysis
 Kate Clark Flora, Death Dealer: How Cops and Cadaver Dogs Brought a Killer to Justice
 Dru Ann Love, Dru’s Book Musings
 J.W. Ocker, Poe-Land: The Hallowed Haunts of Edgar Allan Poe

Best Short Story 
Winner:
 Art Taylor, “The Odds Are Against Us” from Ellery Queen Mystery Magazine
Shortlist:
 Craig Faustus Buck, “Honeymoon Sweet” from Murder at the Beach: The Bouchercon Anthology 2014
 Barb Goffman, "The Shadow Knows” from Chesapeake Crimes: Homicidal Holidays
 Paul D. Marks, “Howling at the Moon” Ellery Queen Mystery Magazine, Nov 2014
 John Shepphird, “Of Dogs and Deceit” from Alfred Hitchcock Mystery Magazine, Nov 2014

Best Anthology or Collection 
Winner:
 Laurie R. King & Leslie S. Klinger, In the Company of Sherlock Holmes: Stories Inspired by the Holmes Canon
Shortlist:
 David Baldacci, FaceOff
 Dana Cameron, Murder at the Beach: The Bouchercon Anthology 2014
 Joe Clifford, Trouble in the Heartland: Crime Fiction Inspired by the Songs of Bruce Springsteen
 Karen Pullen, Carolina Crimes: 19 Tales of Love, Lust, and Longing

External links 
 Official Website

References 

Anthony Awards
46